Nicolás Mejía (born 11 February 2000) is a Colombian tennis player.

Mejía has a career high ATP singles ranking of 239 achieved on 18 April 2022. He also has a career high ATP doubles ranking of 153 achieved on 7 November 2022.

Mejía represents Colombia at the Davis Cup, where he has a W/L record of 2–7.

ATP Challenger and ITF Futures finals

Singles: 6 (3–3)

Doubles: 14 (6–8)

Junior Grand Slam finals

Doubles: 0–1

Record against top 10 players
Mejía record against players who have been ranked in the top 10, with those who are active in boldface. Only ATP Tour main draw matches are considered:

Wins over top 30 players
He has a  record against players who were, at the time the match was played, ranked in the top 30.

*

Notes

External links

2000 births
Living people
Colombian male tennis players
Sportspeople from Bogotá
Tennis players from Miami
Tennis players at the 2018 Summer Youth Olympics
Tennis players at the 2019 Pan American Games
Central American and Caribbean Games bronze medalists for Colombia
Central American and Caribbean Games medalists in tennis
Pan American Games competitors for Colombia
21st-century Colombian people